The 1919 College Baseball All-Southern Team consists of baseball players selected at their respective positions after the 1919 NCAA baseball season.

All-Southerns

Key
NJ = Lonnie Noojin's selections

ST = Herman Stegeman's selections.

References

All-Southern
College Baseball All-Southern Teams